Peter Beckford may refer to:
 Peter Beckford (colonial administrator) (1643–1710), acting governor of Jamaica in 1702
 Peter Beckford (junior) (1672/3–1735), his son, politician, slave owner and businessman in colonial Jamaica
 Sir Peter Beckford (hunter) (1740–1811), British landowner, huntsman, writer and collector